Prince Andrew, Duke of York,  (Andrew Albert Christian Edward; born 19 February 1960) is the third child and second son of Queen Elizabeth II and Prince Philip, Duke of Edinburgh, and a younger brother of King Charles III. Andrew is eighth in the line of succession to the British throne, and the first person in the line who is not a descendant of the reigning monarch.

Andrew served in the Royal Navy as a helicopter pilot and instructor and as the captain of a warship. During the Falklands War, he flew on multiple missions including anti-surface warfare, casualty evacuation, and Exocet missile decoy. In 1986, he married Sarah Ferguson and was made Duke of York. They have two daughters: Princess Beatrice and Princess Eugenie. Their marriage, separation in 1992, and divorce in 1996 attracted extensive media coverage. As Duke of York, Andrew undertook official duties and engagements on behalf of the Queen. He served as the UK's Special Representative for International Trade and Investment for 10 years until July 2011.

In 2014, the American-Australian campaigner Virginia Giuffre alleged that, as a 17-year-old, she was sex-trafficked to Andrew by the American financier and convicted sex offender Jeffrey Epstein. Andrew denied any wrongdoing. Following criticism for his association with Epstein, Andrew resigned from public roles in May 2020, and his honorary military affiliations and royal charitable patronages were removed by Elizabeth II in January 2022. He was the defendant in a civil lawsuit over sexual assault filed by Giuffre in the State of New York. The lawsuit was settled out of court in February 2022.

Early life

Andrew was born in the Belgian Suite of Buckingham Palace on 19 February 1960 at 3:30 p.m., the third child and second son of Queen Elizabeth II and Prince Philip, Duke of Edinburgh. He was baptised in the palace's Music Room on 8 April 1960.

Andrew was the first child born to a reigning British monarch since Princess Beatrice in 1857. As with his siblings, Charles, Anne, and Edward, Andrew was looked after by a governess, who was responsible for his early education at Buckingham Palace. He was sent to Heatherdown School near Ascot in Berkshire. In September 1973, he entered Gordonstoun, in northern Scotland, which his father and elder brother had also attended. He was nicknamed "the Sniggerer" by his schoolmates at Gordonstoun, because of "his penchant for off-colour jokes, at which he laughed inordinately". While there, he spent six months—from January to June 1977—participating in an exchange programme to Lakefield College School in Canada. He left Gordonstoun in July two years later with A-levels in English, history, and economics.

Military service

Royal Navy
The Royal Household announced in November 1978 that Andrew would join the Royal Navy the following year. In December, he underwent various sporting tests and examinations at the Aircrew Selection Centre, at RAF Biggin Hill, along with further tests and interviews at HMS Daedalus, and interviews at the Admiralty Interview Board, . During March and April 1979, he was enrolled at the Royal Naval College Flight, undergoing pilot training, until he was accepted as a trainee helicopter pilot and signed on for 12 years from 11 May 1979. On 1 September of the same year, Andrew was appointed as a midshipman, and entered Britannia Royal Naval College, Dartmouth. During 1979 he also completed the Royal Marines All Arms Commando Course for which he received his Green Beret. He was commissioned as a sub-lieutenant on 1 September 1981 and appointed to the Trained Strength on 22 October.

After passing out from Dartmouth, Andrew went on to elementary flying training with the Royal Air Force at RAF Leeming, and later, basic flying training with the navy at HMS Seahawk, where he learned to fly the Gazelle helicopter. After being awarded his wings, he moved onto more advanced training on the Sea King helicopter, and conducted operational flying training until 1982. He joined carrier-based squadron, 820 Naval Air Squadron, serving aboard the aircraft carrier, .

Falklands War
On 2 April 1982, Argentina invaded the Falkland Islands, a British overseas territory claimed by it, leading to the Falklands War. Invincible was one of the two operational aircraft carriers available at the time, and, as such, was to play a major role in the Royal Navy task force assembled to sail south to retake the islands.

Andrew's place on board and the possibility of the Queen's son being killed in action made the British government apprehensive, and the cabinet desired that Prince Andrew be moved to a desk job for the duration of the conflict. The Queen, though, insisted that her son be allowed to remain with his ship. Prince Andrew remained on board Invincible to serve as a Sea King helicopter co-pilot, flying on missions that included anti-submarine warfare and anti-surface warfare, Exocet missile decoy, casualty evacuation, transport, and search and air rescue. He witnessed the Argentinian attack on the SS Atlantic Conveyor.

At the end of the war, Invincible returned to Portsmouth, where Queen Elizabeth II and Prince Philip joined other families of the crew in welcoming the vessel home. The Argentine military government reportedly planned, but did not attempt, to assassinate Andrew on Mustique in July 1982. Though he had brief assignments to HMS Illustrious, RNAS Culdrose, and the Joint Services School of Intelligence, Prince Andrew remained with Invincible until 1983. Commander Nigel Ward's memoir, Sea Harrier Over the Falklands, described Prince Andrew as "an excellent pilot and a very promising officer."

Career naval officer

In late 1983, Andrew transferred to RNAS Portland, and was trained to fly the Lynx helicopter. On 1 February 1984 he was promoted to the rank of Lieutenant, whereupon Queen Elizabeth II appointed him as her personal aide-de-camp. Prince Andrew served aboard HMS Brazen as a flight pilot until 1986, including deployment to the Mediterranean Sea as part of Standing NRF Maritime Group 2. He undertook the Lieutenants' Greenwich Staff course. On 23 October 1986, the Duke of York (as he was by then) transferred to the General List, enrolled in a four-month helicopter warfare instructor's course at RNAS Yeovilton, and, upon graduation, served from February 1987 to April 1988 as a helicopter warfare officer in 702 Naval Air Squadron, RNAS Portland. He also served on HMS Edinburgh as an officer of the watch and Assistant Navigating Officer until 1989, including a six-month deployment to the Far East as part of exercise Outback 88.

The Duke of York served as flight commander and pilot of the Lynx HAS3 on HMS Campbeltown from 1989 to 1991. He also acted as Force Aviation Officer to Standing NRF Maritime Group 1 while Campbeltown was flagship of the NATO force in the North Atlantic from 1990 to 1991. He passed the squadron command examination on 16 July 1991, attended the Staff College, Camberley the following year, and completed the Army Staff course. He was promoted to Lieutenant-Commander on 1 February and passed the ship command examination on 12 March 1992. From 1993 to 1994, Prince Andrew commanded the Hunt-class minehunter HMS Cottesmore.

From 1995 to 1996, Andrew was posted as Senior Pilot of 815 Naval Air Squadron, then the largest flying unit in the Fleet Air Arm. His main responsibility was to supervise flying standards and to guarantee an effective operational capability. He was promoted to Commander on 27 April 1999, finishing his active naval career at the Ministry of Defence in 2001, as an officer of the Diplomatic Directorate of the Naval Staff. In July of that year, Andrew was retired from the Active List of the Navy. Three years later, he was made an Honorary Captain. On 19 February 2010, his 50th birthday, he was promoted to Rear Admiral. Five years later, he was promoted to Vice Admiral.

He ceased using his honorary military titles in January 2022. The action came after more than 150 Royal Navy, RAF and Army veterans signed a letter, requesting that Queen Elizabeth II remove his honorary military appointments in light of his involvement in a sexual assault civil case. It was reported that he would still retain his service rank of Vice Admiral.

Personal life

Personal interests
Andrew is a keen golfer and has had a low single-figure handicap. He was captain of the Royal and Ancient Golf Club of St Andrews between 2003 and 2004—during the club's 250th anniversary season—was patron of a number of royal golf clubs, and had been elected as an honorary member of many others. In 2004, he was criticised by Labour Co-op MP Ian Davidson, who in a letter to the NAO questioned Andrew's decision to fly to St Andrews on RAF planes for two golfing trips. Andrew resigned his honorary membership of the Royal and Ancient Golf Club of St Andrews when the Queen removed royal patronages at several golf clubs. His honorary membership of the Royal Dornoch Golf Club was revoked in the following month.

Andrew is a Liveryman of the Worshipful Company of Shipwrights, the senior maritime City livery company.

Relationship with Koo Stark
Andrew met the American photographer and actress Koo Stark in February 1981, before his active service in the Falklands War. In October 1982, they took a holiday together on the island of Mustique. Tina Brown said that Stark was Andrew's only serious love interest. In 1983, they split up under pressure from press, paparazzi, and palace. In 1997, Andrew became godfather to Stark's daughter. When Andrew was facing accusations in 2015 over his connection to Jeffrey Epstein, Stark came to his defence.

Marriage to Sarah Ferguson

Andrew married Sarah Ferguson at Westminster Abbey on 23 July 1986. On the same day, Queen Elizabeth II created him Duke of York, Earl of Inverness, and Baron Killyleagh. The first two of these titles were previously held by both his maternal grandfather and great-grandfather. Prince Andrew had known Ferguson since childhood; they had met occasionally at polo matches, and became re-acquainted with each other at Royal Ascot in 1985.

The couple appeared to have a happy marriage and had two daughters together, Beatrice and Eugenie, presenting a united outward appearance during the late 1980s. His wife's personal qualities were seen as refreshing in the context of the formal protocol surrounding the royal family. However, Andrew's frequent travel due to his military career, as well as relentless, often critical, media attention focused on the Duchess of York, led to fractures in the marriage. On 19 March 1992, the couple announced plans to separate and did so in an amicable way. Some months later, pictures appeared in the tabloid media of the Duchess in intimate association with John Bryan, her financial advisor at the time, which effectively ended any hopes of a reconciliation between Andrew and Ferguson. The marriage ended in divorce on 30 May 1996. The Duke of York spoke fondly of his former wife: "We have managed to work together to bring our children up in a way that few others have been able to and I am extremely grateful to be able to do that."

In May 2010, Sarah was filmed by a News of the World reporter saying Andrew had agreed that if she were to receive £500,000, he would meet the donor and pass on useful top-level business contacts. She was filmed receiving, in cash, $40,000 as a down payment. The paper said that Andrew did not know of the situation. In July 2011, Sarah stated that her multi-million pound debts had been cleared due to the intervention of her former husband, whom she compared to a "knight on a white charger".

Sarah admitted that she had made a "gigantic error of judgement" in allowing Jeffrey Epstein to pay off a debt for her,  and apologised for accepting money from him. She did however continue to defend Andrew in his controversial former friendship with Mr Epstein.

Residences
As Andrew and Sarah shared custody of their two daughters, the family continued to live at Sunninghill Park (built near Windsor Great Park for the couple in 1990) until Andrew moved to the Royal Lodge in 2004. In 2007, Sarah moved into Dolphin House in Englefield Green, less than a mile from the Royal Lodge. In 2008, a fire at Dolphin House resulted in Sarah moving into Royal Lodge, again sharing a house with Andrew. Andrew's lease of Royal Lodge is for 75 years, with the Crown Estate as landlord, at a cost of a single £1 million premium and a commitment to spend £7.5 million on refurbishment. In March 2023, it was reported that Andrew had been offered Frogmore Cottage after his nephew Prince Harry was requested to vacate the residence. The offer came amid reports that Andrew could no longer afford the Royal Lodge's running costs as he was about to lose his annual grant.

Health
On 2 June 2022, Andrew tested positive for COVID-19, and it was announced that he would not be present at the Platinum Jubilee National Service of Thanksgiving at St Paul's Cathedral on 3 June.

Allegations of sexual abuse

Jeffrey Epstein and related associations
Andrew was friends with Jeffrey Epstein, an American financier who was convicted of sex trafficking in 2008. BBC News reported in March 2011 that the friendship was producing "a steady stream of criticism", and there were calls for him to step down from his role as trade envoy. Andrew was also criticised in the media after his former wife, Sarah, disclosed that he helped arrange for Epstein to pay off £15,000 of her debts. Andrew had been photographed in December 2010 strolling with Epstein in Central Park during a visit to New York City. In July 2011, Andrew's role as trade envoy was terminated and he reportedly cut all ties with Epstein.

On 30 December 2014, a Florida court filing by lawyers Bradley J. Edwards and Paul G. Cassell alleged that Andrew was one of several prominent figures, including lawyer Alan Dershowitz and "a former prime minister", to have participated in sexual activities with a minor later identified as Virginia Giuffre (then known by her maiden name Virginia Roberts), who was allegedly trafficked by Epstein. An affidavit from Giuffre was included in an earlier lawsuit from 2008 accusing the US Justice Department of violating the Crime Victims' Rights Act during Epstein's first criminal case by not allowing several of his victims to challenge his plea deal; Andrew was otherwise not a party to the lawsuit.

In January 2015, there was renewed media and public pressure for Buckingham Palace to explain Andrew's connection with Epstein. Buckingham Palace stated that "any suggestion of impropriety with underage minors is categorically untrue", and later repeated the denial. Requests from Giuffre's lawyers for a statement from Andrew about the allegations, under oath, were returned unanswered.

Giuffre asserted that she had sex with Andrew on three occasions, including a trip to London in 2001 when she was 17, and later in New York and on Little Saint James in the U.S. Virgin Islands. She alleged Epstein paid her $15,000 after she had sex with Andrew in London. Flight logs show Andrew and Giuffre were in the places she alleged their meetings took place. Andrew and Giuffre were also photographed together with his arm round her waist, with an Epstein associate, Ghislaine Maxwell, in the background, though Andrew's supporters have repeatedly said the photo is fake and edited. Giuffre stated that she was pressured to have sex with Andrew and "wouldn't have dared object" as Epstein, through contacts, could have her "killed or abducted".

On 7 April 2015, Judge Kenneth Marra ruled that the "sex allegations made against Andrew in court papers filed in Florida must be struck from the public record". Marra made no ruling as to whether claims by Giuffre are true or false, specifically stating that she may later give evidence when the case comes to court.

Tuan "John" Alessi, who was Epstein's butler, stated in a deposition he filed for Giuffre's 2016 defamation case against Maxwell that Andrew's hitherto unremarked visits to the Epstein house in Palm Beach were more frequent than previously thought. He maintained that Andrew "spent weeks with us" and received "daily massages".

In August 2019, court documents associated with a defamation case between Giuffre and Maxwell revealed that a second girl, Johanna Sjoberg, gave evidence alleging that Andrew had placed his hand on her breast while in Epstein's mansion posing for a photo with his Spitting Image puppet. Later that month, Andrew released a statement that said, "At no stage during the limited time I spent with [Epstein] did I see, witness or suspect any behaviour of the sort that subsequently led to his arrest and conviction," though he expressed regret for meeting him in 2010 after Epstein had already pleaded guilty to sex crimes for the first time. At the end of August 2019, The New Republic published a September 2013 email exchange between John Brockman and Evgeny Morozov, in which Brockman mentioned seeing a British man nicknamed "Andy" receive a foot massage from two Russian women at Epstein's New York residence during his last visit to the mansion in 2010, and had realised "that the recipient of Irina's foot massage was His Royal Highness, Prince Andrew, the Duke of York".

In July 2020, Caroline Kaufman, an alleged victim of Epstein, said in a federal lawsuit that she had seen Andrew at Epstein's New York mansion in December 2010. In November 2021 Lawrence Visoski, Epstein's pilot, testified in court during Ghislaine Maxwell's trial that Prince Andrew flew in Epstein's private plane along with other prominent individuals, including Bill Clinton, Donald Trump and John Glenn. Visoski stated he did not notice any sexual activity or wrongdoing on the plane. Similarly, Andrew's name was recorded on 12 May 2001 by Epstein's pilot David Rodgers in his logbook, and he testified that Andrew flew three times with Epstein and Giuffre in 2001. The following month a picture of Epstein and Maxwell, sitting at a cabin on the Queen's Balmoral estate, around 1999, at the invitation of Andrew, was shown to the jury to establish their status as partners.

On 5 January 2022, Virginia Giuffre's former boyfriend, Anthony Figueroa, said on Good Morning Britain that Giuffre told him Epstein would take her to meet Prince Andrew. He alleged the meeting had taken place in London. In a court filing, Andrew's lawyers had previously referred to a statement by Figueroa's sister, Crystal Figueroa, who alleged that in her bid to find victims for Epstein, Giuffre had asked her, "Do you know any girls who are kind of slutty?" The same month, Carolyn Andriano, who as a 14-year-old was introduced by Giuffre to Ghislaine Maxwell and Jeffrey Epstein and was a prosecution witness in Maxwell's trial, said in an interview with the Daily Mail that then 17-year-old Giuffre told her in 2001 that she had slept with Prince Andrew. She stated, "And [Giuffre] said, 'I got to sleep with him'. She didn't seem upset about it. She thought it was pretty cool."

In an ITV documentary, former royal protection officer Paul Page, who was convicted and given a six year sentence following a £3 million property investment scam in 2009, recounted Maxwell's frequent visits to Buckingham Palace, and suggested the two might have had an intimate relationship, while Lady Victoria Hervey added that Andrew was present at social occasions held by Maxwell. The Duke of York's name and contact numbers for Buckingham Palace, Sunninghill Park, Wood Farm and Balmoral also appeared in Maxwell and Epstein's 'Little Black Book', a list of contacts of the duo's powerful and famous friends. In February 2022, The Daily Telegraph published a photograph of Andrew along with Maxwell giving a tour of Buckingham Palace to Andrew's guests Bill Clinton and Kevin Spacey, with a member of the tour party describing Maxwell as "the one who led us into Buckingham Palace".

In October 2022, Ghislaine Maxwell was interviewed by a documentary filmmaker while serving her sentence in prison, and when asked about her relationship with Andrew, Maxwell stated that she felt "bad" for him but accepted their "friendship could not survive my conviction. He is paying such a price for the association. I consider him a dear friend. I care about him." She also stated that she now believed the photograph showing her together with Andrew and Virginia Giuffre was not "a true image", and added that in an email to her lawyer in 2015 she was trying to confirm that she recognised her own house, but the whole image cannot be authentic as "the original has never been produced". In another interview from prison, she said the photo was "a fake … there's never been an original and further there is no photograph. I've only ever seen a photocopy of it." Following the allegations, The Mail on Sunday, which first published the photograph in 2011, was contacted by photographer Michael Thomas who took 39 copies of the image, both front and back. The back of the photo has a time stamp showing it was developed on 13 March 2001 – three days after Andrew allegedly engaged in sexual activity with Giuffre – and it was printed at a one-hour photo lab at Walgreens in Florida, near Giuffre's former home.

Giuffre has claimed that on the first night she allegedly had sex with Andrew they got into the bath where "he started licking my toes, between my toes, the arches of my feet" before they went into the bedroom and had sex. She repeated these claims in a 2019 BBC interview. She described the bathroom in her unpublished memoir, stating "It was a beige marble tiled floor with a porcelain Victorian-style bathtub in the middle of the room." In January 2023, Ghislaine Maxwell's brother Ian Maxwell disputed the claims by releasing photos showing his acquaintances sitting in the bathtub where the incident allegedly took place. The photos were originally reserved as a defense for Ghislaine Maxwell's legal team if Giuffre was asked to testify. Ian Maxwell believed the photos "show conclusively that the bath is too small for any sort of sex frolicking. There is no 'Victorian bath', as Giuffre has claimed, which is proved both by the attached plan of the bathroom and the photos themselves."

Newsnight interview

In November 2019, the BBC's Newsnight arranged an interview between Andrew and presenter Emily Maitlis in which he recounted his friendship with Epstein for the first time. In the interview, Prince Andrew says he met Epstein in 1999 through Maxwell; this contradicts comments made by Andrew's private secretary in 2011, who said the two met in "the early 1990s". The Duke also said he did not regret his friendship with Epstein, saying "the people that I met and the opportunities that I was given to learn either by him or because of him were actually very useful".

In the interview, Andrew denied having sex with Giuffre on 10 March 2001, as she had accused, because he had been at home with his daughters after attending a party at PizzaExpress in Woking with his elder daughter Beatrice. Prince Andrew also added that Giuffre's claims about dancing with him at Tramp while he was sweaty were false due to him temporarily losing the ability to sweat after an "adrenaline overdose" during the Falklands War. According to physicians consulted by The Times, an adrenaline overdose typically causes excessive sweating in humans. He also said that he does not drink, despite Giuffre's account of him providing alcohol for them both. Accounts from other people have supported his statement that he does not drink.

Andrew said that he had stayed in Epstein's mansion for three days in 2010, after Epstein's conviction for sex offences against a minor, describing the location as "a convenient place to stay". The Duke said that he met Epstein for the sole purpose of breaking off any future relationship with him. He also said that he would be willing to testify under oath regarding his associations with Epstein.

The interview was believed by Maitlis and Newsnight to have been approved by the Queen, although "palace insiders" speaking to The Sunday Telegraph disputed this. One of Prince Andrew's official advisors resigned just prior to the interview being aired. Although Andrew was pleased with the outcome of the interview – reportedly giving Maitlis and the Newsnight team a tour of Buckingham Palace – it received negative reactions from both the media and the public, both in and outside of the UK. The interview was described as a "car crash", "nuclear explosion level bad" and the worst public relations crisis for the royal family since the death of Diana, Princess of Wales. Experts and those with ties to Buckingham Palace said that the interview, its fallout and the abrupt suspension of Andrew's royal duties were unprecedented.

Civil lawsuit

In August 2021, Virginia Giuffre sued Prince Andrew in the federal District Court for the Southern District of New York, accusing him of "sexual assault and intentional infliction of emotional distress." The lawsuit was filed under New York's Child Victims Act, legislation extending the statute of limitations where the plaintiff had been under 18 at the time, 17 in Giuffre's case.  On 29 October 2021, Andrew's lawyers filed a response, stating that their client "unequivocally denies Giuffre's false allegations". On 12 January 2022 Judge Kaplan rejected Andrew's attempts to dismiss the case, allowing the sexual abuse lawsuit to proceed. In February, the case was settled out of court, with Andrew making a donation to Giuffre's charity for victims of abuse. Criminal proceedings in the United States over Virginia Giuffre's claims remained possible.

Repercussions
On 20 November 2019, a statement from Buckingham Palace announced that Andrew was suspending his public duties "for the foreseeable future". The decision, made with the consent of the Queen, was accompanied by the insistence that Andrew sympathised with Epstein's victims. Other working royals took his commitments over in the short term. On 24 November, the palace confirmed that Andrew was to step down from all 230 of his patronages, although he expressed a wish to have some sort of public role at some future time.

On 16 January 2020, it was reported that the Home Office was recommending "a major downgrade of security" for Andrew, which would put an end to "his round-the-clock armed police protection". On 28 January 2020, US Attorney Geoffrey Berman stated that Prince Andrew had provided "zero co-operation" with federal prosecutors and the FBI regarding the ongoing investigations, despite his initial promise in the Newsnight interview when he said he was willing to help the authorities. Sources close to Andrew said that he "hasn't been approached" by US authorities and investigators, and his legal team announced that he had offered to be a witness "on at least three occasions" but had been refused by the Department of Justice. The US authorities responded to the claim and denied being approached by Andrew for an interview and labeled his statements as a way "to falsely portray himself to the public as eager and willing to cooperate". Spencer Kuvin, who represented nine of Epstein's victims, said Andrew could be arrested if he ever returns to the United States.

In March 2020, Andrew hired crisis-management expert Mark Gallagher, who had helped high-profile clients falsely accused by Operation Midland. In April 2020, it was reported that the Duke of York Young Champions Trophy would not be played anymore, after all activities carried out by the Prince Andrew Charitable Trust were stopped. In May 2020 it was announced that Andrew would permanently resign from all public roles over his Epstein ties.

In June 2020, it became known that Andrew is a person of interest in a criminal investigation in the United States, and that the United States had filed a mutual legal assistance request to British authorities in order to question Andrew. Following the arrest of Ghislaine Maxwell in July 2020, Andrew cancelled a planned trip to Spain, reportedly due to fears that he might be arrested and extradited to the United States. In the 2019 BBC interview, Andrew told Newsnight his association with Epstein was derived from his long-standing friendship with Ghislaine Maxwell, who was later convicted of colluding in Epstein's sexual abuse.

In August 2020, anti-child trafficking protesters chanting "Paedophile! Paedophile!" referencing Andrew gathered outside Buckingham Palace, and videos of the protest went viral. In 2020, prosecutors seeking access to Andrew made a formal mutual legal assistance request to the British government. In early 2021 there were at least two trespassing incidents reported at his Windsor property, and in December he was verbally abused by a woman as he was driving.

In January 2022, Andrew's social media accounts were deleted, his page on the royal family's website was rewritten in the past tense and his military affiliations and patronages were removed to put an emphasis on his departure from public life. He also stopped using the style His Royal Highness (HRH) though it was not formally removed. In the same month, York Racecourse announced that it would rename the Duke of York Stakes, and Prince Andrew High School in Nova Scotia, which had announced two years earlier that it was considering a name change, stated that it would have a new name at the next academic year. In February 2022, Belfast City Council and the Northern Ireland Assembly decided not to fly a union flag for Andrew's birthday. In the same month, the Mid and East Antrim Borough Council announced that they would hold a debate in June 2022 regarding a motion to rename Prince Andrew Way in Carrickfergus. On 27 April 2022 York City Council unanimously voted to remove Andrew's Freedom of the City. Rachael Maskell York Central MP said Andrew was the "first to ever have their freedom removed".

In March 2022, Andrew made his first official appearance in months, helping the Queen to walk into Westminster Abbey for a memorial service for his father, the Duke of Edinburgh. There was a mixed reaction by commentators to his presence, with some saying that it would send the wrong message to victims of sexual abuse "about how powerful men are able to absolve themselves from their conduct" and others arguing that his appearance was required as "a son, in memory of his father".

In June 2022, Andrew took part in private aspects of the Garter Day ceremony, including lunch and investiture of new members, but was excluded from the public procession following an intervention by his brother Charles and his nephew William that banned him from appearing anywhere the public could see him.

In June 2022 Rachael Maskell MP introduced a 'Removal of Titles' private members bill in the House of Commons. If passed this bill will enable people considered unworthy to be stripped of aristocratic titles, which was not previously possible. The monarch or a committee of Parliament would be able to remove a title. The bill is due to get its second reading on 24 March 2023. Maskell said that 80% of York citizens want Andrew to lose all connection with their city.

Following the death of the Queen on 8 September 2022, Andrew appeared in civilian clothing at various ceremonial events. As he walked behind his mother's coffin in a funeral procession in Edinburgh on 12 September, a 22-year-old man shouted "Andrew, you're a sick old man"; the heckler was arrested and charged with committing a breach of the peace. Andrew wore military uniform for a 15-minute vigil by the Queen's coffin at Westminster Hall on 16 September.

In November 2022, it was reported that Andrew was set to lose his police protection as he was no longer expected to carry out public duties in accordance with the King's wishes. In December 2022, The Telegraph reported that Andrew had written to the Home Office and the Metropolitan Police to complain about the situation. His armed personal protection officers were expected to be replaced by private security guards, which are likely to be paid for by the King, at an estimated cost of up to £3 million a year. In January 2023 it was reported that he could no longer use his suite of rooms at Buckingham Palace.

Prince Andrew has not carried out royal duties since November 2019, and having dropped from the public gaze following the newsnight interview, he is also no longer receiving any taxpayer funding.

Activities and charitable work

Patronages

The Duke was patron of the Middle East Association (MEA), the UK's premier organisation for promoting trade and good relations with the Middle East, North Africa, Turkey and Iran. Since his role as Special Representative for International Trade and Investment ended Andrew continued to support UK enterprise without a special role. Robert Jobson said he did this work well and wrote, "He is particularly passionate when dealing with young start-up entrepreneurs and bringing them together with successful businesses at networking and showcasing events. Andrew is direct and to the point, and his methods seem to work".

The Duke was also patron of Fight for Sight, a charity dedicated to research into the prevention and treatment of blindness and eye disease, and was a member of the Scout Association. He toured Canada frequently to undertake duties related to his Canadian military role. Rick Peters, the former Commanding Officer of the Royal Highland Fusiliers of Canada stated that Prince Andrew was "very well informed on Canadian military methods". He became the patron of the charity Attend in 2003, and was a member of the International Advisory Board of the Royal United Services Institute.

On 3 September 2012, Andrew was among a team of 40 people who abseiled down The Shard (tallest building in Europe) to raise money for educational charities the Outward Bound Trust and the Royal Marines Charitable Trust Fund. The Duke of York lent his support to organisations that focus on science and technology by becoming the patron of Catalyst Inc and TeenTech. In 2014, Andrew visited Geneva, Switzerland, to promote British science at CERN's 60th anniversary celebrations.

In 2013, it was announced that Andrew was becoming the patron of London Metropolitan University and the University of Huddersfield. In July 2015, he was installed as Chancellor of the University of Huddersfield. In recognition of Andrew's promotion of entrepreneurship he was elected to an Honorary Fellowship at Hughes Hall in the University of Cambridge on 1 May 2018. On 19 November 2019, the Students' Union of the University of Huddersfield passed a motion to lobby Andrew to resign as its chancellor, as London Metropolitan University was considering Andrew's role as its patron. On 21 November, Andrew relinquished his role as chancellor of the University of Huddersfield.

In March 2019, Andrew took over the patronage of the Outward Bound Trust from his father, the Duke of Edinburgh, serving up until his own resignation in November 2019. Prince Andrew had held the position of chairman of the board of trustees of the organisation since 1999. In May 2019, it was announced that Andrew had succeeded Lord Carrington as patron of the Royal Fine Art Commission Trust.

On 13 January 2022, it was announced that his royal patronages had been handed back to the Queen to be distributed among other members of the royal family. In January 2023, it was reported that King Charles III had agreed to let Andrew pursue some business interests.

Initiatives
While touring India as a part of the Queen's Diamond Jubilee in 2012, Andrew became interested in the work of Women's Interlink Foundation (WIF), a charity which helps women acquire skills to earn income. He and his family later initiated Key to Freedom, a project which tries to "find a route to market for products made by WIF".

In 2014, Andrew founded the Pitch@Palace initiative to support entrepreneurs with the amplification and acceleration of their business ideas. Entrepreneurs selected for Pitch@Palace Bootcamp are officially invited by Andrew to attend St James Palace in order to pitch their ideas and to be connected with potential investors, mentors and business contacts. In May 2018, he visited China and opened the Pitch@Palace China Bootcamp 2.0 at Peking University. On 18 November 2019, accountancy firm KPMG announced it would not be renewing its sponsorship of Prince Andrew's entrepreneurial scheme Pitch@Palace, and on 19 November Standard Chartered also withdrew its support.

The Duke also founded The Prince Andrew Charitable Trust which aimed to support young people in different areas such as education and training. In May 2020, it was reported that the Prince Andrew Charitable Trust was under investigation by the Charity Commission regarding some regulatory issues about £350,000 of payments to his former private secretary Amanda Thirsk.

He also founded a number of awards including Inspiring Digital Enterprise Award (iDEA), a programme to develop the digital and enterprise skills, the Duke of York Award for Technical Education, given to talented young people in technical education, and the Duke of York Young Entrepreneur Award, which recognised talents of young people in entrepreneurship.

Controversies and other incidents

Special Representative for International Trade and Investment

From 2001 until July 2011, Andrew worked with UK Trade & Investment, part of the Department for Business, Innovation and Skills, as the United Kingdom's Special Representative for International Trade and Investment. The post, previously held by Prince Edward, Duke of Kent, involved representing and promoting the UK at various trade fairs and conferences around the world. His suitability for the role was challenged in the House of Commons by Shadow Justice Minister Chris Bryant in February 2011, at the time of the 2011 Libyan civil war, on the grounds that he was "not only a very close friend of Saif al-Islam Gaddafi, but also ... a close friend of the convicted Libyan gun smuggler Tarek Kaituni". Further problems arose as he hosted a lunch for Sakher El Materi, a member of the corrupt Tunisian regime, at the Palace around the time of the Tunisian Revolution. Andrew also formed a friendship with Ilham Aliyev, the president of Azerbaijan who has been criticised for corruption and for abuses of human rights by Amnesty International, and visited him both during and after his tenure as the UK trade envoy. As of November 2014, Andrew had met Aliyev, on 12 occasions. The controversies, together with his ties to Jeffrey Epstein, made him step down from the role in 2011.

Andrew did not receive a salary from the UK Trade & Investment for his role as Special Representative, but he went on expenses-paid delegations and was alleged to have occasionally used trips paid for by the government for his personal leisure, which earned him the nickname "Airmiles Andy" by the press. On 8 March 2011, The Daily Telegraph reported: "In 2010, the Prince spent £620,000 as a trade envoy, including £154,000 on hotels, food and hospitality and £465,000 on travel."

In November 2020, and following reviews of emails, internal documents, and unreported regulatory filings as well as interviews with 10 former bank insiders, Bloomberg Businessweek reported on Andrew using his royal cachet and role as Special Representative for International Trade and Investment for helping David Rowland and his private bank, Banque Havilland, with securing deals with clients around the world. The Rowland family are among the investment advisers to Andrew, and he was present for the official opening ceremony of their bank in July 2009.

Alleged comments on corruption and Kazakhstan
As the United Kingdom's Special Trade Representative, Andrew travelled the world to promote British businesses. It was revealed in the United States diplomatic cables leak that Andrew had been reported on by Tatiana Gfoeller, the United States Ambassador to Kyrgyzstan, discussing bribery in Kyrgyzstan and the investigation into the Al-Yamamah arms deal. The Duke, she explained, "was referencing an investigation, subsequently closed, into alleged kickbacks a senior Saudi royal had received in exchange for the multi-year, lucrative BAE Systems contract to provide equipment and training to Saudi security forces." The dispatch continued: "His mother's subjects seated around the table roared their approval. He then went on to 'these (expletive) journalists, especially from the National Guardian , who poke their noses everywhere' and (presumably) make it harder for British businessmen to do business. The crowd practically clapped!"

In May 2008, he attended a goose-hunt in Kazakhstan with President Nursultan Nazarbayev. In 2010, it was revealed that the President's billionaire son-in-law Timur Kulibayev paid Andrew's representatives £15 million – £3 million over the asking price – via offshore companies, for Andrew's Surrey mansion, Sunninghill Park. Kulibayev frequently appears in US dispatches as one of the men who have accumulated millions in gas-rich Kazakhstan. It was later revealed that Andrew's office tried to get a crown estate property close to Kensington Palace for Kulibayev at that time.
 
In May 2012, it was reported that Swiss and Italian police investigating "a network of personal and business relationships" allegedly used for "international corruption" were looking at the activities of Enviro Pacific Investments which charges "multi-million pound fees" to energy companies wishing to deal with Kazakhstan. The trust is believed to have paid £6 million towards the purchase of Sunninghill which now appears derelict. In response, a Palace spokesman said "This was a private sale between two trusts. There was never any impropriety on the part of The Duke of York".

Libby Purves wrote in The Times in January 2015: "Prince Andrew dazzles easily when confronted with immense wealth and apparent power. He has fallen for 'friendships' with bad, corrupt and clever men, not only in the US but in Libya, Kazakhstan, Uzbekistan, Tunisia, wherever."

In May 2016, a fresh controversy broke out when the Daily Mail alleged that Andrew had brokered a deal to assist a Greek and Swiss consortium in securing a £385 million contract to build water and sewerage networks in two of Kazakhstan's largest cities, while working as British trade envoy, and had stood to gain a £4 million payment in commission. The newspaper published an email from Andrew to Kazakh oligarch Kenges Rakishev, (who had allegedly brokered sale of the Prince's Berkshire mansion Sunninghill Park), and said that Rakishev had arranged meetings for the consortium. After initially saying the email was a forgery, Buckingham Palace sought to block its publication as a privacy breach. The Palace denied the allegation that Andrew had acted as a "fixer" calling the article "untrue, defamatory and a breach of the editor's code of conduct".

A former Foreign Office minister, MP Chris Bryant stated: "When I was at the Foreign Office it was very difficult to see in whose interests he [Andrew] was acting. He doesn't exactly add lustre to the Royal diadem".

Arms sales
In March 2011, Kaye Stearman of the Campaign Against the Arms Trade told Channel 4 News CAAT sees Prince Andrew as part of a bigger problem, "He is the front man for UKTI. Our concerns are not just Prince Andrew, it's the whole UKTI set up. They see arms as just another commodity but it has completely disproportionate resources. At the London office of UKTI the arms sector has more staff than all the others put together. We are concerned that Prince Andrew is used to sell arms, and where you sell arms it is likely to be to despotic regimes. He is the cheerleader in chief for the arms industry, shaking hands and paving the way for the salesmen."

In January 2014, Prince Andrew took part in a delegation to Bahrain, a close ally of the United Kingdom. Spokesman for CAAT, Andrew Smith said, "We are calling on Prince Andrew and the UK government to stop selling arms to Bahrain. By endorsing the Bahraini dictatorship Prince Andrew is giving his implicit support to their oppressive practices. When our government sells arms it is giving moral and practical support to an illegitimate and authoritarian regime and directly supporting their systematic crackdown on opposition groups. (...) We shouldn't allow our international image to be used as a PR tool for the violent and oppressive dictatorship in Bahrain."

Andrew Smith has also said, "The prince has consistently used his position to promote arms sales and boost some of the most unpleasant governments in the world, his arms sales haven't just given military support to corrupt and repressive regimes. They've lent those regimes political and international legitimacy."

Reaction to election to the Royal Society
Andrew's election to the Royal Society prompted "Britain's leading scientists" to "revolt" due to Andrew's lack of scientific background, with some noting he had only a secondary school level of education. In an op-ed in The Sunday Times,  pharmacologist, Humboldt Prize recipient, and Fellow of the Royal Society, David Colquhoun opined, in references to Andrew's qualifications, that "if I wanted a tip for the winner of the 14.30 at Newmarket, I'd ask a royal. For most other questions, I wouldn't."

Allegations of racist language 
Rohan Silva, a former Downing Street aide, claimed that, when they met in 2012, Andrew had commented, "Well, if you'll pardon the expression, that really is the nigger in the woodpile." Former home secretary Jacqui Smith also claims that Andrew made a racist comment about Arabs during a state dinner for the Saudi royal family in 2007. Buckingham Palace denied that Andrew had used racist language on either occasion.

Allegations of ramming gates in Windsor Great Park 
In March 2016, Republic CEO Graham Smith filed a formal report to the police, requesting an investigation into allegations that Andrew had damaged sensor-operated gates in Windsor Great Park by forcing them open in his Range Rover to avoid going an extra mile on his way home. The Thames Valley Police dismissed the reports due to lack of details.

Treatment of reporters, servants and others
During his four-day Southern California tour in 1984, Andrew squirted paint onto American and British journalists and photographers who were reporting on the tour, after which he told Los Angeles county supervisor Kenneth Hahn, "I enjoyed that". The incident damaged the clothes and equipment of reporters and the Los Angeles Herald Examiner submitted a $1,200 bill to the British consulate asking for financial compensation.

The Guardian wrote in 2022, "his brusque manner with servants is well-documented. A senior footman once told a reporter who worked undercover at Buckingham Palace that on waking the prince 'the response can easily be "fuck off" as good morning'." Former royal protection officer Paul Page said, in an ITV documentary, that Andrew maintained a collection of "50 or 60 stuffed toys" and if they "weren't put back in the right order by the maids, he would shout and scream and become verbally abusive." Page later stated in the documentary Prince Andrew: Banished that different women would visit Andrew everyday, and when one was denied entry into his residence by the security Andrew allegedly called one of the officers a "fat, lardy-ass cunt" over the phone. The Duke's former maid, Charlotte Briggs, also recalled setting up the teddy bears on his bed and told The Sun that when she was bitten by his Norfolk Terrier in 1996 he only laughed and "wasn't bothered". She said that she was reduced to tears by Andrew for not properly closing the heavy curtains in his office and added that his behaviour was in contrast to that of his brothers Charles and Edward who "weren't anything like him" and his father Philip whom she described as "so nice and gentlemanly".

Massage therapist Emma Gruenbaum said Andrew regularly overstepped the mark, making creepy sexual comments when she came to give him a massage. Gruenbaum maintained Andrew talked continually about sex during the first massage and wanted to know when she last had sex. Gruenbaum said Andrew arranged regular massages for roughly two months, and she believed requests for massages stopped when he realised he would not get more.

Finances and debt problems

The Duke of York received a £249,000 annuity from the Queen, which is expected to be cut from April 2023. In the twelve-month period up to April 2004, he spent £325,000 on flights, and his trade missions as special representative for UKTI cost £75,000 in 2003. The Sunday Times reported in July 2008 that for "the Duke of York's public role... he last year received £436,000 to cover his expenses". He has a Royal Navy pension of £20,000.

The Duke is also a keen skier and in 2014 bought a skiing chalet in Verbier, Switzerland, for £13 million jointly with his ex-wife, Sarah Ferguson. In May 2020, it was reported that they were in a legal dispute over the mortgage. To purchase the chalet, they secured a loan of £13.25 million and were expected to pay £5 million in cash instalments which, after applying interests, amounted to £6.8 million. Despite claims that the Queen would help pay the debt, a spokesperson for Andrew confirmed that she "will not be stepping in to settle the debt". The Times reported in September 2021 that Andrew and Sarah had reached a legal agreement with the property's previous owner and would sell the house. The owner agreed to receive £3.4 million, half of the amount that she was owed, as she had been under the impression that Andrew and Sarah were dealing with financial troubles. The money from selling the property is reportedly to be used to pay Andrew's legal expenses over the civil lawsuit as well. In June 2022 it was reported in Le Temps, a Swiss newspaper, that the chalet has been frozen because of a £1.6 million debt Andrew owes unnamed people. Law professor Nicolas Jeandin told Le Temps "A sale is in principle impossible, except with the agreement of the creditor."

In 2021 Bloomberg News reported that a firm connected to David Rowland had been paying off Andrew's debts. In November 2017, Andrew borrowed £250,000 from Banque Havilland, adding to an existing £1.25 million loan that had been "extended or increased 10 times" since 2015. Documents showed that while "credibility of the applicant" had been questioned, he was given the loan in an attempt to "further business potential with the Royal Family". 11 days later and in December 2017, £1.5 million was transferred from an account at Albany Reserves, which was controlled by the Rowland family, to Andrew's account at Banque Havilland, paying off the loan that was due in March 2018.

Several months after Andrew's controversial 2019 Newsnight interview, his private office established the Urramoor Trust, which owned both Lincelles Unlimited (established 2020) and Urramoor Ltd (established 2013), and according to The Times was set up to support his family. Lincelles was voluntarily wound up in 2022. Andrew was described as a "settlor but not a beneficiary", and did not own either of the companies, though Companies House listed him and his private banker of 20 years Harry Keogh as people with "significant control".

In March 2022 it was reported that on 15 November 2019 the wife of the jailed former Turkish politician İlhan İşbilen transferred £750,000 to Andrew in the belief that it would help her secure a passport. The Duke has repaid the money 16 months later after being contacted by Mrs İşbilen's lawyers. The Telegraph reported that the money sent to Andrew's account had been described to the bankers "as a wedding gift" for his eldest daughter, Beatrice, though the court documents did not include any suggestions that the princess was aware of the transactions. Mrs İşbilen alleges that a further £350,000 payment was made to Andrew through businessman Selman Turk, who Mrs İşbilen is suing for fraud. Turk had been awarded the People's Choice Award for his business Heyman AI at a Pitch@Palace event held at St James's Palace days before the £750,000 payment was made by Mrs İşbilen.  Libyan-born convicted gun smuggler, Tarek Kaituni introduced Andrew to Selman Turk in May or June 2019 and held later meetings on at least two occasions. Kaituni, for whom Andrew allegedly lobbied a British company, had reportedly given Princess Beatrice a £18,000 gold and diamond necklace for her 21st birthday in 2009, and was invited to Princess Eugenie's wedding in 2018.

Titles, styles, honours and arms

Titles and styles

Andrew was originally styled "His Royal Highness The Prince Andrew". On 23 July 1986, he was granted the Dukedom of York, the Earldom of Inverness, and the Barony of Killyleagh, and assumed the style "His Royal Highness The Duke of York".

, Andrew is eighth in the line of succession to the British throne. On rare occasions he is known by his secondary titles of Earl of Inverness in Scotland, and Baron Killyleagh in Northern Ireland.

In January 2022, it was reported that, while Andrew retains the style of His Royal Highness, he would no longer use it in a public capacity. He has since used it in a private capacity.

In 2019, Inverness residents started a campaign to strip him of the Earldom of Inverness, saying that "it is inappropriate that Prince Andrew is associated with our beautiful city", in light of his friendship with the convicted sex offender Jeffrey Epstein. There was a renewed petition in Inverness in 2022. Similar pleas have been made by people affiliated with the village of Killyleagh regarding his title of Baron Killyleagh, and the city of York, with Labour Co-op MP for York Central, Rachael Maskell, stating that she would look for ways to make Andrew give up his ducal title if he did not voluntarily relinquish it. In April 2022, several York councillors called for Andrew to lose the title of Duke of York.

Naval ranks
  1979–1981: Midshipman, Britannia Royal Naval College, HMS Seahawk
  1981–1984: Sub Lieutenant, Pilot, 820 NAS on HMS Invincible;
  1984–1992: Lieutenant, Pilot, 815 NAS on HMS Brazen; Helicopter Warfare Instructor, 702 NAS at RNAS Culdrose; Flight Commander, 829 NAS on HMS Campbeltown
  1992–1999: Lieutenant Commander, Captain, HMS Cottesmore; Senior Pilot, 815 NAS at RNAS Portland; Directorate of Naval Operations, Ministry of Defence
  1999–2005: Commander, Diplomacy Section of the Naval Staff. Released from the active list in 2001.
  2005–2010: Honorary Captain
  2010–2015: Rear Admiral
  2015–present: Vice Admiral

Honours

Commonwealth

 21 February 2011: Knight Grand Cross of the Royal Victorian Order (GCVO)
 2 June 2003 – 21 February 2011: Knight Commander of the Royal Victorian Order (KCVO)
 19 December 1979 – 2 June 2003: Commander of the Royal Victorian Order (CVO)
 23 April 2006: Royal Knight of the Most Noble Order of the Garter (KG)
 1977: Queen Elizabeth II Silver Jubilee Medal
 1982: South Atlantic Medal, with Rosette
 2002: Queen Elizabeth II Golden Jubilee Medal
 2012: Queen Elizabeth II Diamond Jubilee Medal
 2022: Queen Elizabeth II Platinum Jubilee Medal
 2016: Naval Long Service and Good Conduct Medal
 1990: New Zealand 1990 Commemoration Medal
 2001: Canadian Forces' Decoration (CD) (with the first clasp)
 2005: Commemorative Medal for the Centennial of Saskatchewan

Foreign

  1988: Grand Cross of the Order of St. Olav
  2010: Collar of the Order of the Federation
  2015: Sash of the Order of the Aztec Eagle
  2017: Order of Isabella the Catholic

Appointments
 1 February 1984 – 13 January 2022: Personal aide-de-camp to the Queen
 23 February 1987 – 27 April 2022: Freeman of the City of York
 2007: Lord High Commissioner to the General Assembly of the Church of Scotland
 5 May 2013: Royal Fellow of the Royal Society (FRS)
 20 February 2015 – 13 January 2022: Grand President of the Royal Commonwealth Ex-Services League
 13 July 2015 – 21 November 2019: Chancellor of the University of Huddersfield
 20 April 2016: Honorary Fellow of the Society of Light and Lighting (Hon. FSLL)
 1 May 2018 – November 2019: Honorary Fellow of Hughes Hall, Cambridge

Former honorary military appointments
In 2019, Andrew's military affiliations were suspended and on 13 January 2022 they were formally returned to the Queen.

  Colonel-in-Chief of The Queen's York Rangers (1st American Regiment) (RCAC)
  Colonel-in-Chief of the Royal Highland Fusiliers of Canada
  Colonel-in-Chief of the Princess Louise Fusiliers
  Colonel-in-Chief of the Canadian Airborne Regiment (disbanded)

  Colonel-in-Chief of the Royal New Zealand Army Logistic Regiment

  Colonel of the Grenadier Guards
  Colonel-in-Chief of the Royal Irish Regiment (27th (Inniskilling) 83rd and 87th and Ulster Defence Regiment)
  Colonel-in-Chief of the Small Arms School Corps
  Colonel-in-Chief of the Yorkshire Regiment (14th/15th, 19th and 33rd/76th Foot)
  Colonel-in-Chief of the 9th/12th Royal Lancers (Prince of Wales's) (disbanded)
  Deputy Colonel-in-Chief of the Royal Lancers (Queen Elizabeth's Own)
  Royal Colonel of the Royal Highland Fusiliers, 2nd Battalion Royal Regiment of Scotland
  Honorary Air Commodore, Royal Air Force Lossiemouth
  Commodore-in-Chief of the Fleet Air Arm
  Admiral of the Sea Cadet Corps

Arms

Issue

Ancestry

References

Footnotes

Citations

Bibliography
 Photographs (1985) by HRH Prince Andrew. London: Hamilton. . . A book of photographs taken by Andrew.

External links
 
 The Duke of York at the Royal Family website
 The Duke of York at the website of the Government of Canada
 
 

Prince Andrew, Duke of York
1960 births
Living people
20th-century British people
21st-century British people
British princes
Children of Elizabeth II
Earls of Inverness
English Anglicans
English people of Danish descent
English people of German descent
English people of Greek descent
English people of Russian descent
English people of Scottish descent
Falklands War pilots
Fleet Air Arm aviators
Graduates of Britannia Royal Naval College
Helicopter pilots
York
Honorary air commodores
House of Windsor
Jeffrey Epstein
Knights Grand Cross of the Royal Victorian Order
Knights of the Garter
Lakefield College School alumni
Lords High Commissioner to the General Assembly of the Church of Scotland
Mountbatten-Windsor family
People educated at Gordonstoun
People educated at Heatherdown School
People from Old Windsor
People from Sunninghill
People from Westminster
Presidents of the Football Association
Princes of the United Kingdom
Recipients of the Order of Isabella the Catholic
Royal Navy vice admirals
Royal Navy personnel of the Falklands War
Sons of monarchs
Younger sons of dukes